João Souza was the defending champion, but lost to eventual champion Facundo Bagnis.
Bagnis defeated compatriot Facundo Argüello 6–2, 4–6, 6–3 in the final.

Seeds

Draw

Finals

Top half

Bottom half

References
 Main Draw
 Qualifying Draw

Seguros Bolivar Open Cali - Singles
2013 Singles
2013 in Colombian tennis